Brock High School is a public high school located in unincorporated Brock, Texas, United States and classified as a 3A school by the UIL.  It is part of the Brock Independent School District located in north central Parker County.  In 2015, the school was rated "Met Standard" by the Texas Education Agency.

Athletics
The Brock Eagles compete in these sports - 

Cross Country, Volleyball, Football, Basketball, Powerlifting, Golf, Tennis, Track, Softball & Baseball

State Titles
Baseball - 
2006(2A)
Girls Basketball - 
2002(1A/D1), 2003(2A), 2005(2A), 2009(2A), 2010(2A), 2011(2A), 2012(2A), 2013(2A)
Boys Basketball - 
2002(1A/D1), 2003(2A), 2015(3A)
Boys Golf - 
2015(3A)
Boys Track
2022(3A)
Softball - 
2009(2A)
Volleyball - 
2012(2A)
Football -
2015 (3A/D1)
UIL Lone Star Cup Champions 
2009(2A), 2010(2A), 2015(3A), 2016(3A), 2018(3A), 2019 (3A)

State Finalists
Football
2021(3A/D1)

Baseball
2022(3A)

References

External links
Brock ISD

Public high schools in Texas
Schools in Parker County, Texas